The 2014 Australian Goldfields Open was a professional ranking snooker tournament that took place between 30 June–6 July 2014 at the Bendigo Stadium in Bendigo, Australia. It was the second ranking event of the 2014/2015 season.

Marco Fu was the defending champion, but he decided not to compete this year.

Judd Trump won his fourth ranking title by defeating Neil Robertson 9–5 in the final.

Prize fund
The breakdown of prize money for this year is shown below:

Winner: $75,000
Runner-up: $32,000
Semi-final: $20,000
Quarter-final: $17,000
Last 16: $12,000
Last 32: $9,000
Last 48: $1,600
Last 64: $750
Last 96: $150

Non-televised highest break: $100
Televised highest break: $2,500
Total: $500,000

Wildcard round
These matches were played in Bendigo on 30 June 2014.

Main draw

Final

Qualifying
These matches were held between 30 May and 3 June 2014 at The Capital Venue in Gloucester, England.

Century breaks

Qualifying stage centuries

 140, 110  Joe Swail
 139  Cao Yupeng
 138, 119  Liam Highfield
 136  Zhou Yuelong
 136  Elliot Slessor
 130  Nigel Bond
 129  Luca Brecel
 126  Jamie Jones
 126  Mark King
 121, 103  Jack Lisowski
 121  Scott Donaldson
 118  Anthony McGill
 114  Steven Hallworth
 113  Alan McManus
 108  Cao Xinlong
 108  Aditya Mehta
 107  Andrew Higginson
 106  Liang Wenbo
 106  Ian Burns
 105, 100  Barry Pinches
 105  Mark Joyce
 104, 100  Lee Walker
 102  Paul Davison
 102  Oliver Brown
 100  Daniel Wells

Televised stage centuries

 140, 109, 103, 100  Neil Robertson
 139  Mark Davis
 127  John Higgins
 122  Mark Joyce
 114, 114, 110, 107, 106, 101, 101, 100  Judd Trump
 109  Dominic Dale
 108  Peter Ebdon
 107  Robert Milkins
 107  Martin Gould
 105  Matthew Stevens
 104  Ricky Walden
 103  Fergal O'Brien
 103  Shaun Murphy
 102  Stuart Bingham

References

External links
 2014 Australian Goldfields Open – Pictures by Tai Chengzhe at Facebook

2014
Australian Goldfields Open
Goldfields Open
Sport in Bendigo